The Electronics and Telecommunications Research Institute is a Korean government-funded research institution in Daedeok Science Town in Daejeon, Republic of Korea.

Overview

Established in 1976, ETRI is a non-profit government-funded research institute. In the 1980s, ETRI developed TDX (Time Division Exchange) and 4M DRAM (Dynamic Random Access Memory). In the 1990s, ETRI commercialized Code-division multiple access. In the 2000s, ETRI developed Terrestrial DMB, WiBro, and 4G LTE Advanced,  for mobile communications.

ETRI is one of the leading research institutes in the wireless communication domain with more than 2,500 patents filed.

ETRI developed ship-area network technology, portable automatic language interpretation, and automated valet parking technology.
As of December 14, 2015, ETRI had about 2,000 employees of which about 1,800 are researchers.

Chronology

References

External links 

ETRI Webzine
ETRI Journal

Research institutes established in 1976
Research institutes in South Korea
1976 establishments in South Korea